The 2017 Singapore Community Shield (also known as the Great Eastern Community Shield for sponsorship reasons) was the 10th edition of the Singapore Community Shield held on 26 February 2017 at National Stadium, between the winners of the previous season's S.League and Singapore Cup competitions. The match was contested by 2016 Singapore Cup winners Albirex Niigata (S) and 2016 S.League runners-up Tampines Rovers.

This was the first time whereby a Shield match was played at the new National Stadium after opening in 2014.

Albirex Niigata (S) won the Shield for the second consecutive time after defeating Tampines Rovers 2–1.

Match

See also
2017 S.League
2017 Singapore Cup
2017 Singapore League Cup

References

Singapore Community Shield